Qabaq Tappeh or Qabaq Tepe, also rendered as Qapaq Tepe, may refer to:
 Qabaq Tappeh, East Azerbaijan
 Qabaq Tappeh, Hamadan
 Qabaq Tappeh-ye Kord, Hamadan Province
 Qabaq Tappeh, Kermanshah

See also
 Qabaqtəpə, Azerbaijan